Kadakampally Surendran (born 12 October 1954) is an Indian politician, who served as the Minister for Co-Operation, Tourism, and Devaswom in the first Pinarayi Vijayan ministry (2016–2021) of the Government of Kerala. He was the Thiruvananthapuram District Committee Secretary of the Communist Party of India (Marxist) for nearly a decade (2007–2016).

A member of the Communist Party of India (Marxist), he is presently a member of the Kerala state committee of the party. He is also an elected representative in the 15th Kerala legislative assembly from the Kazhakkoottam assembly constituency in the Thiruvananthapuram district. 

Surendran has been a prominent figure of the CPI(M) and other leftist progressive movements in the district of Thiruvananthapuram for more than four decades. He is also a forerunner in trade union activities in the state of Kerala.

Early life and education 

Born as the son of C. K. Krishnan Kutty and Bhagavathi Kutty on 12 October 1954 at Kadakampally of Thiruvananthapuram district, Surendran had his education from Sambhuvattom Lower Primary School, Madhavapuram Upper Primary School, St. Joseph High School, S N College, Chempazhanthy, and University College, Thiruvananthapuram.

Personal life

He is married to Sulekha Surendran and has two children, Arun and Anoop. His wife Sulekha is a retired high school teacher from AMHSS, Thirumala, Thiruvananthapuram. Surendran and his wife currently reside at Karikkakom, Trivandrum.

Political life 
Right from his school days, he was active in student movements and cultural activities. He came to the political front and social activities from his constant association with youth organizations.

In the year 1974, he became a member of CPI(M). He served the party as its secretary, Anayara Branch, secretary, Local Committee Pettah, secretary, Vanchiyur Area Committee, member, District Committee Trivandrum, and secretary, District Committee Trivandrum. In 2008, he was elected as a member of the Kerala State Committee of the CPI(M) in its 19th State Conference which was held at Kottayam.

Other mass organizations 

Presently, he is a member of the National Council of Centre of Indian Trade Unions (CITU), a socialist organization of trade unions in India. He serves as the office-bearer of many trade unions including the Auto-Taxi Workers Federation, K.S.F.D.C Employees Union, C-DIT Employees Association, Co-operative Academy of Professional Education (CAPE) Employees Union, and SPATO.

Parliamentary positions held 

 Elected as Member of 15th Legislative Assembly of Kerala with a mammoth margin of nearly 24000 votes from Kazhakuttom constituency (May 2021).
 Elected as Member of 14th Legislative Assembly of Kerala and served as minister for Co-Operation, Tourism, and Devaswom from 25 May 2016 – 20 May 2021.
 Served as the president of Kerala State Co-Operative Bank (2006–2008).
 Served as the president, Thiruvananthapuram District Library Council (1995–2010).
 Elected twice to the Syndicate of the University of Kerala (2006 & 2014).
 Elected as Member of 10th Legislative Assembly of Kerala with a mammoth margin of more than 24000 votes from Kazhakuttom constituency and was the chairman of Backward Caste Welfare Committee (1996–2001).
 Elected to the first district council with a mammoth margin from Pettah division (1990–1991).
 Served as the vice-president of Kadakampally Grama Panchayat (1977–1982).

References

External links

Communist Party of India (Marxist) politicians from Kerala
People from Thiruvananthapuram district
Living people
Place of birth missing (living people)
1954 births
Kerala MLAs 1996–2001
Kerala MLAs 2016–2021